Morgan High School may refer to:

B.C. Morgan High School, in Mobile, Alabama
West Morgan High School, in Trinity, Alabama
George Morgan Junior/Senior High School, in Upper Kalskag, Alaska
Fort Morgan High School, in Fort Morgan, Colorado
Morgan County High School (Georgia), in Madison, Georgia
Morgan Park High School, in Chicago, Illinois
Morgan County High School (Kentucky), in West Liberty, Kentucky
Morgan City High School, in Morgan City, Louisiana
Morgan County R-I High School, in Stover, Missouri
Morgan County High School, in Versailles, Missouri
Morgan High School (McConnelsville, Ohio), in McConnelsville, Ohio)
Jefferson-Morgan Middle/High School, in Jefferson, Pennsylvania
Morgan High School (Texas), in Morgan, Texas
Morgan High School (Utah), in Morgan, Utah
Morgan High School Harare, in Harare, Zimbabwe
The Morgan School, in Clinton, Connecticut